Friedrich Wessel (born 29 April 1945) is a German fencer. He competed in the individual and team foil events at the 1968 and 1972 Summer Olympics.

References

1945 births
Living people
German male fencers
Olympic fencers of West Germany
Fencers at the 1968 Summer Olympics
Fencers at the 1972 Summer Olympics
Sportspeople from Bonn